Solhaug is a surname. Notable people with the surname include:

Arne J. Solhaug (born 1942), Norwegian educator, singer, composer, and author
Karsten Anker Solhaug (1914–2012), Norwegian salvationist

 Surnames of Norwegian origin